is a Japanese football player. He currently plays as a forward for Tokushima Vortis.

Career statistics
Last update: 1 January 2020.

Reserves performance

References

External links
Profile at Gamba Osaka

1997 births
Living people
People from Yatsushiro, Kumamoto
Association football people from Kumamoto Prefecture
Japanese footballers
J1 League players
J2 League players
J3 League players
Gamba Osaka players
Gamba Osaka U-23 players
Kyoto Sanga FC players
Yokohama FC players
Tokushima Vortis players
Association football forwards